Linfa Wang, is Professor and Director of the Emerging Infectious Diseases Programme at Duke-NUS Medical School, Singapore.

Education and career 
Wang earned his Bachelor's degree at the East China Normal University in Shanghai in 1982 obtained his PhD at the University of California, Davis in 1986.

Wang's early research was at the Monash Centre for Molecular Biology and Medicine and in 1990, he joined the Commonwealth Scientific and Industrial Research Organisation (CSIRO), at the Australian Animal Health Laboratory (AAHL), where he played a leading role in identifying bats as the natural host of the Severe Acute Respiratory Syndrome (SARS) virus.

See also 
 Shi Zhengli

References 

Living people
Chinese virologists
Coronavirus researchers
University of California, Davis alumni
Year of birth missing (living people)

External links